In the textile industry, a tow (or hards) is a coarse, broken fibre, removed during processing flax, hemp, or jute and separated from the shives. Flax tows are often used as upholstery stuffing and oakum. Tows in general are frequently cut up to produce staple fibre.  The very light color of flax tow is the source of the word "towhead", meaning a person with naturally light blond hair.

Composite materials 
In the artificial fibre and composites industries, a tow is an untwisted bundle of continuous filaments, in particular of acrylic,  carbon fibres, or viscose rayon. Tows are designated either by their total tex (mass in grams per 1000 m length) or by the number of fibres they contain. For example, a 12K tow contains 12,000 fibres.

Spread tow fabrics are woven sheet materials, used for composite layup, where the warp and weft are flat tows, rather than spun yarns, in order to provide the maximum strength as a composite.

References 

Fibers
Spinning